Robert Lowe is an American singer.

Biography 
Lowe was brought into the band Solitude Aeturnus by his friend Lyle Steadham in 1988, replacing Kris Gabehardt. He is also the main lyricist on later albums. Lowe also appeared as a session singer on the first Last Chapter album. In 1996, he sings on the debut album by trio out of Arlington, Texas: Liquid Sound Company: "Exploring the Psychedelic".

On January 22, 2007, Leif Edling announced Lowe to be the main vocalist for the band Candlemass, and Lowe recorded the albums King of the Grey Islands (2007), Death Magic Doom (2009), and  Psalms for the Dead (2012). He also appeared on EP Lucifer Rising (2008). He was the band's longest serving vocalist after Messiah Marcolin. On June 2, 2012, Lowe left Candlemass.

The same year, 2007, he recorded and released an album with a side project called Concept of God, including fellow former Solitude Aeturnus members. The album was titled Visions and was released by Massacre Records. 

He played bass in two shows with rock band Muthalode.

A press release dated May 1, 2012 announced Lowe's recruitment for session vocals on the Wagnerian Opera Metal project Lyraka's upcoming album.

On September 17, 2017, he joined the American heavy metal/doom metal band "Tyrant".

On April 1, 2019, Grief Collector from Minnesota released their debut album From Dissension to Avowal with Lowe on vocals.
On February 14, 2022, the band announced that they had "parted ways" with Lowe.

Lowe was recruited May 14, 2020 to record vocals for ex-Lyraka composer Andy DiGelsomina's solo album in 2020

Discography

With Solitude Aeturnus
Into the Depths of Sorrow (1991)
Beyond the Crimson Horizon (1992)
Through the Darkest Hour (1994)
Days of Doom (VHS, 1994)
Downfall (1996)
Adagio (1998)
Alone (2006)
Hour of Despair (DVD, 2007)

With Last Chapter
The Living Waters (1998)

With Concept of God
Visions (2007)

With Candlemass
King of the Grey Islands (2007)
Candlemass 20 Year Anniversary (DVD, 2007)
Lucifer Rising (EP, 2008)
Death Magic Doom (2009)
Ashes to Ashes (live CD/DVD, 2010)
Psalms for the Dead (2012)

With Grief Collector 
 From Dissension to Avowal (2019)
 En Delirium (2021)

With Tyrant 
 Hereafter (2020)

With DiGelsomina 
 Sic Itur Ad Astra (TBA)

References

External links

American heavy metal singers
Year of birth missing (living people)
Living people
Singers from Texas
Candlemass (band) members